RWO Alzey is a German football club from the city of Alzey, Rhineland-Palatinate.

History
The club was established on 6 June 1910 as 1. Alzeyer Fußball-Club Olympia. Like many smaller clubs throughout Germany, Olympia was forced into a merger with other local sides under the policies of the Nazi regime, playing alongside Turnverein Alzey and Schwimmclub Alzey. The club was briefly lost following World War II when occupying Allied authorities banned most organizations in the country, including sports and football associations.

The team was reestablished 25 January 1946 as Sportgemeinde Rot-Weiß Alzey. A separate side called 1. Alzeyer FC Olympia broke away in 1955, but rejoined the parent team on 7 February 1956 to form the present day club.

A longtime local level club, RWO broke through for a single season in the Oberliga Südwest (IV) in 1996–97 and was sent down after a 17th-place result.

Nowadays the club plays in the tier seven Landesliga Südwest-Ost.

References

External links
Official team site
Das deutsche Fußball-Archiv historical German domestic league tables 

Football clubs in Germany
Football clubs in Rhineland-Palatinate
Association football clubs established in 1910
1910 establishments in Germany